Grand River Bridge may refer to:

Grand River Bridge (Ontario), Canada
Grand River Bridge (Arispe, Iowa), U.S.
Grand River Bridge (Leon, Iowa), U.S.

See also
Grand River (disambiguation)
Interstate 90 Grand River bridges